Japanese anemone is a common name for Eriocapitella japonica, a species of flowering plant in the family Ranunculaceae.

The common name Japanese anemone is also used for several other species of flowering plants in the genus Eriocapitella, including:

 Eriocapitella hupehensis
 Eriocapitella × hybrida, the Japanese anemone hybrid
 Eriocapitella tomentosa